Bruce Barnes (born June 21, 1951) is a former punter in the National Football League.

College career
Barnes was the primary punter for UCLA Bruins for three seasons. He led the Pacific-8 in punting all three years and was named All-Pacific-8 as a senior.

Professional career
Barnes was selected in the 12th round (290th overall) of the 1973 NFL Draft by the New England Patriots. As a rookie, Barnes punted 55 times for 2,134 yards (38.8 average). Barnes served as the Patriots' punter for the first nine games of the 1974 season before he was waived in November.

Personal life
Barnes is the father of professional golfer Ricky Barnes.

References

1951 births
Living people
American football punters
UCLA Bruins football players
People from Sanger, California
Players of American football from California
Sportspeople from Fresno County, California
New England Patriots players